Samuel Ames (September 6, 1806 – December 20, 1865) was an American jurist.

Biography
Samuel Ames was born in Providence, Rhode Island on September 6, 1806. He was educated at Philips Academy Andover and Brown University, graduating from the latter in 1823. A few years later Ames was admitted to the Rhode Island bar, and became prominent in public affairs. Ames married Mary Throop Dorr, sister of Thomas Wilson Dorr, in 1838, and they had five children. He was a member of the state legislature for several terms, presiding as speaker in 1844-45. During the Dorr Rebellion, he acted as quartermaster of the state troops. In 1853, Ames was elected to represent his state in the adjustment of the boundary between Rhode Island and Massachusetts. He succeeded William R. Staples as chief justice of the Rhode Island Supreme Court, serving from 1856 to 1865, when he resigned due to poor health. He was delegate to the Peace Conference of 1861. He died in Providence on December 20, 1865.

Works 

 "Angell and Ames of Corporations" (1832)

References

1806 births
1865 deaths
Brown University alumni
Chief Justices of the Rhode Island Supreme Court
Phillips Academy alumni
19th-century American judges